Lyttleton Morgan was the first chairman of the board of trustees of Morgan State University, which was renamed in his honor (it was founded as the Centenary Biblical Institute).

Career
Rev. Morgan was "station-preacher" meaning that he generally traveled to different churches to preach the Gospel, without having a church of his own. He had preached at every prominent church in the Baltimore Methodist Episcopal Conference. Morgan also served as chaplain to the United States House of Representatives from 1851 to 1852. He was married to Susan Rigby Dallam Morgan, a poet of the Poe era.

Morgan State University, in Baltimore, used to be the Centenary Biblical Institute of the Methodist Episcopal, but was renamed in his honor in 1890.

References

Year of birth missing
1895 deaths
19th-century American people
Chaplains of the United States House of Representatives
American Christian clergy
Morgan State University people